Camp Grant may refer to:
 Camp Grant, California
 Camp Grant (Illinois)
 Camp Grant (Arizona), site of the Camp Grant massacre